Minuscule 803 (in the Gregory-Aland numbering), ε614 (von Soden), is a Greek minuscule manuscript of the New Testament written on paper. Palaeographically it has been assigned to the 16th century.

Description 
The codex contains the text of the three first Gospels (Matthew, Mark, Luke), on 215 paper leaves (size ).

The text is written in one column per page, 15-20 lines per page. According to Gregory it has 177 leaves, according to von Soden 176 leaves.

There is also another division according to the smaller Ammonian Sections, but without a references to the Eusebian Canons.

Text 
Kurt Aland the Greek text of the codex did not place in any Category.

It was not examined according to the Claremont Profile Method.

History 
According to C. R. Gregory the manuscript was written in the 16th century. The manuscript is currently dated by the INTF to the 16th century.

According to the subscription it once belonged to "Ananiou Hegoumenou".

It was added to the list of New Testament manuscripts by Gregory (803e). Gregory saw the manuscript in 1886.

The manuscript is now housed at the National Library of Greece (88) in Athens.

See also 

 List of New Testament minuscules
 Biblical manuscript
 Textual criticism
 Minuscule 802
 Minuscule 808

References

Further reading 

 

Greek New Testament minuscules
16th-century biblical manuscripts
Manuscripts of the National Library of Greece